Loch Sheldrake is a hamlet and  census-designated place (CDP) in the Town of Fallsburg, New York, United States, in Sullivan County. The zip code for Loch Sheldrake is 12759.

The community was originally named Sheldrake Pond after a deep, glacially formed pond, which forms the center of town. It is bordered by the hamlet of Hurleyville, the Town of Liberty, the hamlet of Hasbrouck, the hamlet of Divine Corners, and the hamlet of Woodbourne.

The commercial center of Loch Sheldrake is the intersection of County Road 104 and NYS Route 52, at the edge of Sheldrake Pond.

In its heyday as a Catskills Borscht Belt resort it was home to numerous hotels, bungalow colonies  and boarding houses. Some of the best known of these were the Brown's Hotel, where comedian Jerry Lewis worked; the Evans Hotel; and the Karmel Hotel, now Stagedoor Manor, a renowned performing arts summer camp.

It is also the home of Sullivan County Community College and the Lochmor Golf Course.

Congregation Adath Israel, the Loch Sheldrake Synagogue was listed on the National Register of Historic Places in 1997.  The Synagogue is open in the summer and for the High Holidays, under the leadership of Rabbi Dr. Rashi Shapiro.

In 2012, a year-round Hasidic community was founded in Loch Sheldrake, in Town and Country Estates, with a synagogue, mikvah, a boys cheder, and a girls nursery school.

Notable institutions
Sullivan County Community College - a community that has won four NJCAA Men's Division III Basketball Championships since 1992
Stagedoor Manor - a performing arts summer camp

Notable people
Francis S. Currey - birthplace of World War II Medal of Honor recipient
Cleanthony Early - played college basketball at SUNY Sullivan and Wichita State; former NBA player for the New York Knicks from 2014-2016

References

External links
 http://www.sullivancountyhistory.org/
 http://www.townoffallsburg.com/

Hamlets in New York (state)
Fallsburg, New York
Census-designated places in Sullivan County, New York
Hamlets in Sullivan County, New York
Census-designated places in New York (state)